Ernest Shorrocks (12 March 1875 – 20 July 1916) was an English cricketer who played in one first-class cricket match for Somerset in the 1905 season.

A professional who batted in the lower order and bowled 20 overs in his one match, Shorrocks was picked for the Somerset match against Lancashire at Taunton. He took the wickets of Reggie Spooner and James Hallows for 60 runs as Lancashire made 401 on the first day, then made 0 and an unbeaten 16 as Somerset were beaten by an innings. He was one of three Somerset debutants in the match; for one of the others, Alfred Trestrail, this was also the only first-class match. The third, John Harcombe, played six further matches for Somerset up to 1919.

Shorrocks was a serjeant in the 20th battalion of the Royal Fusiliers and died in the First World War in the fighting on the Somme. He is commemorated on the Thiepval Memorial.

References

External links
Ernest Shorrocks at www.cricketarchive.com

1875 births
1916 deaths
English cricketers
Somerset cricketers
British military personnel killed in the Battle of the Somme
British Army personnel of World War I
Royal Fusiliers soldiers
Military personnel from Lancashire
People from Middleton, Greater Manchester